"The World Is Too Much with Us" is a sonnet by the English Romantic poet William Wordsworth. In it, Wordsworth criticises the world of the First Industrial Revolution for being absorbed in materialism and distancing itself from nature. Composed circa 1802, the poem was first published in Poems, in Two Volumes (1807). Like most Italian sonnets, its 14 lines are written in iambic pentameter.

Theme
In the early 19th century, Wordsworth wrote several sonnets lambasting what he perceived as "the decadent material cynicism of the time." "The World Is Too Much with Us" is one of those works. It reflects his view that humanity must get in touch with people to progress spiritually. The rhyme scheme of the poem is a-b-b-a, a-b-b-a, c-d-c-d, c-d. This Italian or Petrarchan sonnet uses the last six lines (sestet) to answer the first eight lines (octave).
The first eight lines (octave) are the problems and the next six (sestet) are the solution.

The poem expresses a revolt against the industrial revolution and criticizes the materialistic approach of man. It also criticizes ignoring nature: 'little we see in nature that is ours'.

There is escapism in the sestet of the sonnet and the poet wishes to be a pagan than a modern man.

See also

References

Further reading
 
 

Poetry by William Wordsworth
1802 poems
1807 poems
Sonnets